The following outline is provided as an overview of and topical guide to Dubai.

General reference 
 Pronunciation:
 Common English name(s): Dubai
 Official English name(s): Dubai
 Adjectival(s): Dubaite
 Demonym(s): Dubaite

Geography of Dubai 
Geography of Dubai
 Dubai is:
 a city
 capital of Emirate of Dubai
 Population of Dubai: 3,010,261
 Area of Dubai: 4,114 km2 (1,588 sq mi)

Location of Dubai 

 Dubai is situated within the following regions:
 Northern Hemisphere and Eastern Hemisphere
 Asia (outline)
 Western Asia
 Arabian Peninsula 
 United Arab Emirates 
 Emirate of Dubai
 Dubai-Sharjah-Ajman metropolitan area
 Time zone(s): 
 UAE Standard Time (UTC+4)

Environment of Dubai 

 Climate of Dubai
 Sustainability in Dubai

Natural geographic features of Dubai 

 Beaches in Dubai
 Jumeirah Beach
 Canals in Dubai
 Dubai Water Canal
 Creeks in Dubai 
 Dubai Creek
 Desert in Dubai
 The Empty Quarter
 Lakes in Dubai
 Al Qudra Lake
 Mountains in Dubai
 Al Hajar Mountains

Areas of Dubai 

 Deira
 Hatta
 Jumeirah

Districts of Dubai 

 Al Bastakiya
 Al Karama
 Bur Dubai
 Business Bay
 Downtown Dubai
 Dubai Marina

Communities in Dubai 

Communities in Dubai

Locations in Dubai 

 Tourist attractions in Dubai
 Museums in Dubai
 Shopping areas and markets

Bridges in Dubai 

Bridges in Dubai
Al Garhoud Bridge
Al Ittihad Bridge
Al Maktoum Bridge
Business Bay Crossing
Floating Bridge
Sheikh Rashid bin Saeed Crossing

Cultural and exhibition centres in Dubai 

 Dubai International Convention Centre
 Markaz

Forts of Dubai 
 Al Fahidi Fort

Fountains in Dubai 

 The Dubai Fountain

Monuments and memorials in Dubai 

 Deira Clocktower

Museums and art galleries in Dubai 

Museums in Dubai
 Dubai Moving Image Museum
 Dubai Museum
 Etihad Museum
 Museum of the Future
 Saeed Al Maktoum House 
 Salsali Private Museum
 Sheikh Obaid bin Thani House
 The Mine

Parks and gardens in Dubai 

Parks in Dubai
 Dubai Miracle Garden
 Dubai Safari Park
 Mushrif Park
 Safa Park
 Wild Wadi Water Park
 Zabeel Park
 Dubai Frame

Religious buildings in Dubai 

 Al Farooq Omar Bin Al Khattab Mosque
 Dubai City Church
 Grand Mosque
 Hindu Temple
 Iranian Mosque, Bur Dubai
 Jumeirah Mosque
 Masjid Al Rahim
 St. Francis of Assisi Catholic Church

Secular buildings in Dubai 

 23 Marina
 Address Downtown
 Almas Tower
 Burj Al Alam
 Burj Al Arab
 Burj Khalifa
 Cayan Tower
 DAMAC Residenze
 Dubai Pearl
 Dubai World Trade Centre
 Elite Towers
 Emirates Towers
 Gevora Hotel
 HHHR Tower
 Jumeirah Emirates Towers Hotel
 Ocean Heights
 Pentominium
 Rose Rayhaan by Rotana
 The Index
 The Wave Tower

Streets in Dubai 

 Deira Corniche

Towers in Dubai 

 Dubai Creek Tower

Demographics of Dubai 

Demographics of Dubai

Government and politics of Dubai 

Government of Dubai

 Dubai Municipality
 International relations of Dubai
 Twin towns and sister cities of Dubai

Law and order in Dubai 

 Human rights in Dubai
 Human rights in Dubai 
Religious freedom
 Law enforcement in Dubai
 Dubai Police Force
 Sharia laws

History of Dubai

History of Dubai

History of Dubai, by period or event 

Timeline of Dubai

 Early history
 Dubai during the 18th century 
 Dubai during the 19th century
 Dubai becomes a British Protectorate (1892)
 Dubai during the 20th century
 Dubai joins six other emirates in establishing the United Arab Emirates (1971)
 Dubai, in conjunction with the other emirates, introduces the UAE dirham, the uniform currency of the UAE (1973)
 Dubai in the new millennium

History of Dubai, by subject

Archaeological sites in Dubai 
 Al Sufouh Archaeological Site
 Jumeirah Archaeological Site
 Saruq Al Hadid Archaeological Site

Culture of Dubai 

Culture of Dubai
 Dubai Culture

Arts in Dubai

Architecture of Dubai 
 

Architecture of Dubai
 Buildings in Dubai
 Tallest buildings in Dubai
 Tallest residential buildings in Dubai
 Developments in Dubai
 Bluewaters Island
 Downtown Dubai
 Dubailand
 Dubai Waterfront
 Jumeirah Islands
 Palm Islands
Deira Island
Palm Jebel Ali
Palm Jumeirah
 The Universe
 The World
Developments of The World archipelago

Cinema of Dubai 

 Dubai International Film Festival

Literature of Dubai 

 Dubai International Writers' Centre
 Emirates Airline Festival of Literature

Music of Dubai 

Music of Dubai
 Music festivals and competitions in Dubai
 Dubai International Jazz Festival
 Music venues in Dubai
 Dubai Opera
 Musical ensembles in Dubai
 UAE Philharmonic Orchestra
 Songs about Dubai

Visual arts of Dubai 

Art in Dubai
 DUCTAC
 Tashkeel Dubai
Public art in Dubai
 Golden Horses
Dress code in Dubai

Events in Dubai
 Art Dubai
 Dubai Airshow
 Dubai Design Week
 Dubai Motor Show
 Dubai Opera Ball
 Dubai Shopping Festival
 Expo 2020
 UAE Awafi Festival
 World Government Summit

Festivals in Dubai
 Dubai Motor Festival
Languages of Dubai
 English language
 Gulf Arabic

Media in Dubai
 Newspapers in Dubai
Al Bayan
Gulf News
 Radio and television in Dubai
 Radio and television channels of Dubai
People from Dubai
 Juma al Majid

Religion in Dubai 

Religion in Dubai
 Catholicism in Dubai 
St. Mary's Catholic Church
 Hinduism in Dubai
 Hindu Temple
 Islam in Dubai
 Grand Mosque
 Sikhism in Dubai
 Guru Nanak Darbar

Sports in Dubai 

Sport in Dubai
 Football in Dubai
 Association football in Dubai
 Al-Nasr Dubai SC
 Al-Wasl F.C.
 Polo in Dubai
 Sports competitions in Dubai
 Dubai Desert Classic
 Dubai International Rally
 Dubai Marathon
 Dubai Open (golf)
 Dubai Open Chess Tournament
 Dubai Tennis Championships
 Dubai Tour
 Dubai World Cup
 Dubai World Cup Night
 Sports venues in Dubai
 DSC Indoor Arena
 DSC Multi-Purpose Stadium
 Dubai Creek Golf & Yacht Club
 Dubai International Cricket Stadium
 Emirates Golf Club
 Hamdan Sports Complex
 Maktoum bin Rashid Al Maktoum Stadium
 Meydan Racecourse

Economy and infrastructure of Dubai 

Economy of Dubai
 Communications in Dubai
 Financial services in Dubai
 Dubai Financial Market
 Emirates NBD
 Hotels and resorts in Dubai
 The Address Downtown Dubai
 Atlantis, The Palm
 Burj Al Arab
 Hatta Fort Hotel
 Jumeirah Beach Hotel
 Jumeirah Emirates Towers Hotel
 JW Marriott Marquis Dubai
 Madinat Jumeirah
 Rose Rayhaan by Rotana
 Ski Dubai
 Tamani Hotel Marina
 Real estate and property in Dubai
 Developments in Dubai
Development projects in Dubai
 Restaurants and cafés in Dubai
 Mirchi
 Rustar Floating Restaurant
 Verre
 Shopping malls and markets in Dubai
 Shopping malls in Dubai
Ibn Battuta Mall
City Centre Deira
Mall of the Emirates
The Dubai Mall
 Souks in Dubai
Dubai Gold Souk
Dubai Spice Souk
Dubai Textile Souk
 Tourism in Dubai
 Tourist attractions in Dubai

Transportation in Dubai 

Public transport in Dubai
 Air transport in Dubai
 Airports in Dubai 
 Dubai International Airport
Dubai International Airport Cargo Gateway
 Maritime transport in Dubai
 Jebel Ali
 Port Rashid 
 Road transport in Dubai
 Dubai route numbering system
Roads in Dubai
Sheikh Zayed Road

Rail transport in Dubai 

Rail transport in Dubai
 Dubai Metro
 Red Line
 Green Line
 Purple Line (proposed line)
 Blue Line (proposed line)
List of Dubai Metro railway stations
 Dubai Tram
 Dubai Trolley
 Palm Jumeirah Monorail

Education in Dubai 

Education in Dubai
 Schools in Dubai
 Public Schools in Dubai
 Private Schools in Dubai
 Universities and colleges in Dubai
 Public universities and colleges
Higher Colleges of Technology
Zayed University
 Private universities and colleges
American University in the Emirates
British University in Dubai
University of Dubai
Zayed University

Healthcare in Dubai 

Healthcare in Dubai
 Hospitals in Dubai
 Dubai Hospital
 Rashid Hospital

See also 

 Outline of geography

References

External links 

Dubai
Dubai